The  was a heavy metal festival held annually at Saitama Super Arena in Saitama City or Makuhari Messe in Chiba City, Japan. It was one of the biggest heavy metal festivals in Japan.

The festival has featured both Japanese and international performers such as DragonForce, Judas Priest, Megadeth, Slayer, Circus Maximus, Napalm Death, Angra, Loudness, Anthem, United, Outrage, Galneryus, Dir En Grey and Babymetal.

Producer Creativeman formed a joint venture with Live Nation Entertainment in 2013. Live Nation bought full control of the venture (including Loud Park Festival) in 2014.

In 2018, it was announced that the event will not be held that year and will be discontinued "due to various circumstances", but had plans to return in the future.

In 2022, it was announced that it will take place in March 2023 only and it was announced Pantera would be the headliner.

2023 (March 25–26)
Bands confirmed for Loud Park Festival 23: Held at Makuhari Messe on the 26, at Intex Osaka on the 25.

Pantera
Kreator
Nightwish
Stratovarius
Carcass (Only in Tokyo)
Amaranthe (Only in Tokyo)
Bleed from Within
Outrage (Only in Tokyo)
H.E.R.O. (Only in Tokyo)
Jason Richardson & Luke Holland (Only in Tokyo)

2017 (October 14–15)
Bands confirmed for Loud Park Festival 17: Held at Saitama Super Arena on both days.

October 14
Slayer
Emperor
Alice Cooper
Overkill
Opeth
Winger
Brujeria
Anthem
L.A. Guns
Beyond the Black
Skindred
Aldious

October 15
Michael Schenker Fest
Gene Simmons Band
Sabaton
Meshuggah
Cradle of Filth
Black Star Riders
Devin Townsend Project
Loudness
Apocalyptica
Outrage
Black Earth
Cry Venom

2016 (October 8–9)
Bands confirmed for Loud Park Festival 16: Held at Saitama Super Arena on both days.

October 8

Scorpions
Armored Saint
Blind Guardian
Cain's Offering
Children of Bodom (once cancelled, but they withdrew the cancel later)
Danger Danger
Dokken
Exodus
Masterplan
Myrath
Queensrÿche
Shinedown
Aldious
Sons of Texas
Zardonic
Flesh Juicer
Metal Church (cancelled)

October 9
Whitesnake
Amorphis
Dark Funeral
The Dead Daisies
Dizzy Mizz Lizzy
Enslaved
Killswitch Engage

Lacuna Coil
Nightwish
Riot
Savage Messiah
Sixx:A.M.
Symphony X
Terrorizer
Uli Jon Roth
With the Dead
Nocturnal Bloodlust

2015 (October 10–11)
Bands confirmed for Loud Park Festival 15: Held at Saitama Super Arena on both days.

October 10

Slayer
Arch Enemy with Johan Liiva and Christopher Amott
Gamma Ray
Children Of Bodom
Anthrax
Royal Hunt
Testament
Anthem
Backyard Babies
HammerFall
All That Remains
Metal Allegiance
Gojira
House of Lords 
Outrage
Galneryus
Daita
United
Fruitpochette
Metal Church (cancelled)

October 11
Megadeth
Helloween
Carcass
DragonForce
Napalm Death
Dizzy Mizz Lizzy
Sabaton
At the Gates
Soldier of Fortune
Dark Tranquillity
The Local Band
Pretty Maids
Abbath
Kamelot
Mari Hamada
Obituary
Armageddon
We Are Harlot
Gyze

2014 (October 18–19)
Bands confirmed for Loud Park Festival 14: Held at Saitama Super Arena on both days.

October 18

Manowar (cancelled due to the delay of equipment)
Arch Enemy
DragonForce
Rage
Down
Amaranthe
Soilwork
Loudness
Vandenberg's Moonkings
Marty Friedman
Battle Beast
Kamen Jyoshi

October 19

Dream Theater
Kreator
Within Temptation
Death Angel
Riot
The Haunted
Thunder
Belphegor
The Gazette
Glamour of the Kill
Periphery
Arion

2013 (October 19–20)
Bands confirmed for Loud Park Festival 13: Held at Saitama Super Arena on both days.

October 19

Stone Temple Pilots with Chester Bennington
Europe
Angra
Carcass
Behemoth
Lynch Mob
Lordi
Therion
Devin Townsend Project
Bring Me the Horizon
Crossfaith
Lost Society

October 20

King Diamond (cancelled due to the delay of equipment)
Yngwie Malmsteen
Stratovarius
Last in Line
Trivium
Spiritual Beggars
Babymetal
Amorphis
Mokoma
Enforcer
Breaking Arrows
Metal Clone X

2012 (October 27)
Bands confirmed for Loud Park Festival 12: Saitama Super Arena

October 27

Slayer
Helloween
In Flames
Children of Bodom
Sonata Arctica
Dir En Grey
Buckcherry
Cryptopsy
DragonForce
1349
Hibria
Outrage
Halestorm
Naglfar
Circus Maximus
Cristopher Amott
Stone Sour (cancelled due to Jim Root's illness)

2011 (October 15)
Bands confirmed for Loud Park Festival 11: Saitama Super Arena

October 15

Limp Bizkit
Whitesnake
Arch Enemy
The Darkness
Trivium
Unisonic
United
Krokus
Amaranthe
Stryper
August Burns Red
Animetal USA

2010 (October 16–17)
Bands confirmed for Loud Park Festival 10: Held at Saitama Super Arena on both days, and also at Kobe World Kinen Hall on the 16.

October 16

Korn
Halford
Stone Sour
Accept
Ratt
Hellyeah
Dir En Grey
Edguy
Amon Amarth
Chthonic
Engel
Holy Grail

October 17

Ozzy Osbourne (in Kobe on the 16)
Avenged Sevenfold (in Kobe on the 16)
Motörhead (in Kobe on the 16)
Angra (in Kobe on the 16)
Spiritual Beggars (in Kobe on the 16)
Kuni (in Kobe on the 16)
Alexisonfire
Reckless Love
Halestorm
Turisas (in Kobe on the 16)
Trash Talk
3 Inches of Blood
Loudness (only in Kobe on the 16)
Five Finger Death Punch (cancelled)

2009 (October 17–18)
Bands confirmed for Loud Park Festival 09: Makuhari Messe

October 17

Judas Priest
Megadeth
Poison the Well
Arch Enemy
Lynch Mob
Anthrax
Led Zepagain
Dokken
Loudness
Hiroaki Tagawa
Firebird
Fade
Outrage
Liv Moon
Steel Panther
Blessed by a Broken Heart
Ace Frehley (cancelled)

October 18

Slayer
Rob Zombie
Children of Bodom
Anvil
Fair Warning
Gotthard
Papa Roach
Napalm Death
Royal Hunt
Hatebreed
Galneryus
Hibria
Lazarus A.D.
Crossfaith
H.E.A.T
Dead by April
Steadlür (cancelled)

2008 (October 18–19)
Bands confirmed for Loud Park Festival 08: Saitama Super Arena

October 18

Slipknot
Down
Avenged Sevenfold
Carcass
Sonata Arctica
DragonForce
Meshuggah
Obituary
Apocalyptica
Airbourne
Secret and Whisper
Head Phones President

October 19

Mötley Crüe
Buckcherry
Bullet for My Valentine
Machine Head
Loaded
Black Tide
All Ends
Black Stone Cherry

2007 (October 20–23)
Bands confirmed for Loud Park Festival 07: Held at Saitama Super Arena on the 20 and 21, at Zepp Osaka on the 22, and at Osaka-jo Hall on the 23.

October 20

Heaven and Hell (also October 23)
Blind Guardian
Trivium
Machine Head
Nocturnal Rites
As I Lay Dying
Nile (also October 23)
Fastway
Still Remains
Therion
Outrage
Cellador

October 21

Marilyn Manson (also October 23)
Arch Enemy (also October 22)
Hanoi Rocks
Saxon (also October 22))
Satyricon
Tesla
Lacuna Coil
Wig Wam
Andre Matos
Anthem
Amorphis
All That Remains
GNZ-Word (October 22)
Kazuyuki Matsumoto (October 23)

2006 (October 14–15)
Bands confirmed for Loud Park Festival 06: Makuhari Messe

October 14

Megadeth
Anthrax
Napalm Death
Angra
Arch Enemy
United
Dir En Grey
Cathedral
Legend of Rock
Backyard Babies
DragonForce
Firewind
Hardcore Superstar
Opeth
Zeromind
Anvil
Flyleaf
Nora
Korpiklaani (cancelled)
Ministry (cancelled)

October 15

Slayer
Dio
Negative
Children of Bodom
Killswitch Engage
Survive
In Flames
Hatebreed
Mucc
Mastodon
Unearth
The Black Dahlia Murder
Lamb of God
Within Temptation
Cocobat
Bloodsimple
As I Lay Dying
Loyal to the Grave
Bullet for My Valentine (cancelled)

References

External links

Review of Loud Park 2010
Photos and video from Loud Park 2009

Rock festivals in Japan
Heavy metal festivals in Japan
Autumn festivals
Recurring events established in 2006
Recurring events disestablished in 2017
Tourist attractions in Saitama Prefecture
Tourist attractions in Chiba Prefecture
Tourist attractions in Osaka Prefecture
Autumn events in Japan